Trichomycterus guaraquessaba is a species of pencil catfish presently only known from Rio Bracinho, a small isolated river in Paraná state, Brazil.

This is an elongate catfish up to  standard length. It has no unique morphological features and can be distinguished from its congeners by a combination of characters including a uniformly grey colouring with only small dark spots on the flank, pelvic fin not covering the urogenital opening and square-ended caudal fin.

References
 
 

guaraquessaba
Fish of South America
Fish of Brazil
Fish described in 2005